Ildefons Lima Solà (born 10 December 1979) is a professional footballer who plays as a centre-back for FC Andorra B and the Andorra national team.

He has played club football in Spain, Greece, Mexico, Italy, Switzerland and Andorra. At international level, Lima holds the records for most appearances and most goals for Andorra as of 2022.

Early life
Lima was born in Barcelona, Catalonia to an Andalusian father and a Catalan mother. His family moved to Andorra when he was two months old.

Club career
Lima's first years as a senior were spent with FC Andorra, playing one season each in the Spanish third and fourth divisions. Subsequently, he played at both levels with RCD Espanyol B and UE Sant Andreu, splitting the following campaign abroad between Ionikos F.C. of Greece and C.F. Pachuca in Mexico.

In the summer of 2002, Lima returned to Spain, playing one and a half seasons with UD Las Palmas in the second tier and moving in January 2004 to another club in that league, Polideportivo Ejido. He spent the following campaign with Rayo Vallecano in division three.

Lima then played four years with U.S. Triestina Calcio in Italy. With the Trieste side, he was occasionally used as a forward at the request of elusive chairman Flaviano Tonellotto. In 2009, aged nearly 30, he switched countries again, signing for AC Bellinzona of the Swiss Super League.

After two seasons in Switzerland and one back at Triestina, Lima signed again for FC Andorra, now of the Primera Catalana, instead of several offers to play in the principality's Primera Divisió. On 12 June 2014, he joined the latter league's champion FC Santa Coloma. He scored for them on 8 July in the first qualifying round of the UEFA Champions League away to FC Banants, as they advanced on away goals.

International career
Lima made his debut for Andorra aged 17, in the country's second ever game on 22 June 1997, scoring in a 4–1 friendly defeat in Estonia. He went on to lead the national team's scoring charts, and also amassed more than 130 caps.

In June 2009, near the end of the 2010 FIFA World Cup qualifying campaign, Lima scored his first competitive goal for over eight years and six years overall, netting the last goal of a 1–5 away defeat against Belarus. On 9 September 2014, in Andorra's first match of the UEFA Euro 2016 qualification phase, he netted a sixth-minute penalty to give the side a 1–0 lead over Wales, but in an eventual 1–2 home loss.

After Óscar Sonejee, Lima was the second Andorran to reach a century of caps, playing his 100th game on 1 June 2016, a 2–0 friendly loss to Estonia in Tallinn. On 22 February 2017 he opened a 2–0 away win over San Marino in another exhibition game, ending an 86-game winless run.

Lima surpassed Sonejee's national record of 106 internationals on 16 August 2017, when he played a friendly against Qatar in Burton-on-Trent. In 2020, the Andorran Football Federation removed him from the team – against the wishes of coach Koldo Álvarez – when the player spoke out against football resuming in the principality without COVID-19 testing. FIFPro, the world's trade union for footballers, called for FIFA to intervene in his favour.

On 3 June 2021, Lima became just the third European footballer (after Billy Meredith and Jari Litmanen) to be capped in four different decades when playing in a friendly defeat to Republic of Ireland.

Personal life
Despite debuting for the Andorra national team when he was 17, Lima became a citizen when he turned 20 years of residence in the country. His older brother, Antoni, was also a footballer and a defender. He too spent most of his career in the lower leagues of Spain, and the pair shared teams at Ionikos.

Career statistics

International

Scores and results list Andorra's goal tally first, score column indicates score after each Lima goal.

See also
List of men's footballers with 100 or more international caps

References

External links

National team data

Official website 

1979 births
Living people
Andorran people of Spanish descent
Andorran people of Catalan descent
Spanish emigrants to Andorra
Naturalised citizens of Andorra
Spanish footballers
Andorran footballers
Footballers from Barcelona
Association football defenders
Segunda División players
Segunda División B players
Tercera División players
CF Damm players
FC Andorra players
RCD Espanyol B footballers
UE Sant Andreu footballers
UD Las Palmas players
Polideportivo Ejido footballers
Rayo Vallecano players
Ionikos F.C. players
Liga MX players
C.F. Pachuca players
Serie B players
U.S. Triestina Calcio 1918 players
Swiss Super League players
AC Bellinzona players
Primera Divisió players
FC Santa Coloma players
Inter Club d'Escaldes players
Andorra international footballers
Andorran expatriate footballers
Expatriate footballers in Greece
Expatriate footballers in Italy
Expatriate footballers in Switzerland
Expatriate footballers in Mexico
Andorran expatriate sportspeople in Switzerland
FIFA Century Club
Andorran expatriate sportspeople in Italy
Andorran expatriate sportspeople in Mexico
Andorran expatriate sportspeople in Greece